Jungle Child is a 2011 German drama film directed by Roland Suso Richter.
The film is the screen adaptation of the autobiographical bestseller books by Sabine Kuegler tells her experience living with a native tribe of Western Papua, Indonesia from 1979 to 1989.

Plot
Klaus Kuegler is a linguist and travels with his wife Doris and his three children into the tropical rainforest of Western New Guinea, Indonesia in 1979 to explore the language of a newly discovered native tribe, the Fayu. The eight-year-old daughter Sabine quickly settles down. What the family does not know: It has come in the midst of a tribal feud whose battles they do not directly affect, but in which they are increasingly drawn into it. The family does not find it easy at first to understand the reason for the hostilities, and it must realize that love, hate, life and death have different values in the foreign culture than in their own. So begins a process of rapprochement in which both sides have to learn from each other.

One day, when Sabine and her brother find the severely injured Auri and the family feeds him at home, they endanger everyone, as this action can decide on war and peace between the two tribes. Sabine and Auri immediately develop a special bond and deep friendship.

When the family travels to Germany for a holiday after spending years, the sixteen-year-old Sabine is confronted with a completely "foreign" world that is no longer hers. Their search for belonging and security ultimately becomes a search for themselves.  Only after returning to the jungle does she know where her true home is.

Cast
 Stella Kunkat as Sabine Kuegler - child
 Sina Tkotsch as Sabine Kuegler - youth
 Thomas Kretschmann as Klaus Kuegler, Sabine's father
 Nadja Uhl as Doris Kuegler, Sabine's mother
 Tom Hoßbach as Christian Kuegler - child
 Sven Gielnik as Christian Kuegler - youth
 Milena Tscharntke as Judith Kuegler - child
 Emmanuel Simeon as Auri - child
 Felix Tokwepota as Auri - youth
 Range'e Pati as Faisa
 Francesca Passingan as Ältere Faisa
 Christian Jahl as Lehrer Danau Bira
 David Kaumara as Gohu

References

Literature
 Sabine Kuegler: Jungle Child . Droemer Knaur, Munich 2005,  (7 weeks in 2005 in the No. 1 Spiegel bestseller list ); as Knaur paperback 78149, Munich 2008,  .
 Doris Kuegler: Jungle Years - My Life with the Native Americans of West Papua . Gerth Media, Asslar 2011,

External links
 

2011 films
2011 drama films
2010s adventure drama films
German adventure drama films
2010s German-language films
Films set in Western New Guinea
Films set in jungles
Films shot in Malaysia
2010s German films